Christophe Dumolin (born January 4, 1973 in Lyon) is a French former professional football player. He spent eleven years at FC Istres, playing 323 league matches before retiring in 2010.

References

External links
 

1973 births
Living people
French footballers
Ligue 1 players
Ligue 2 players
Grenoble Foot 38 players
Stade Lavallois players
FC Istres players
Association football defenders